Chanukun Karin (born 24 April 1997) is a Thai professional footballer who plays as a Midfielder for Thai League 1 club Police Tero.

Career statistics

Club

International career 
On 14 March 2023, Chanukun was called up to the Thailand national team for the friendly matches against Syria and United Arab Emirates.

Honour 
 North Bangkok University
 Thai League 3 Bangkok Metropolitan Region (1): 2020–21
 Thai League 4 Bangkok Metropolitan Region (2): 2017, 2018

References

External links 
 

1997 births
Living people
Chanukun Karin
Chanukun Karin
Chanukun Karin
Chanukun Karin
Association football midfielders
Chanukun Karin
Chanukun Karin
Chanukun Karin